The Maillé affair concerns a court ordinance obtained by a private company to force scientist Marie-Ève Maillé to give access to data exposing the identity of her research participants. The researcher documented the conflicts that arose in a municipality of Québec in the context of a windfarm project. Dre Maillé, adjunct professor at Université du Québec à Montréal, refuses to comply to the ordinance because it contravenes the ethical duty of preserving the privacy of research data. The ordinance was retracted in May 2017.

Sequence of events 
After a call for bids by Hydro-Québec in 2005, a wind farm project is presented by the Enerfín company for the regional county municipality (RCM) of l'Érable. Eventually, the company receives the contract for the project. Enerfín is a subsidiary of Elecnor, a Spanish S.A. company. 
In 2008, Enerfín creates the subsidiary Éoliennes de l'Érable to develop the project.

The wind farm project divides the citizens of l'Érable. In the report presented to the Bureau d'audiences publiques sur l'environnement, a deterioration of social climate was noted, based on several essays submitted by citizens. Despite the tensions, the project is authorized and the wind farm construction starts in 2011. It has been in activity since 2013.

In 2010, Marie-Ève Maillé interviews residents of the RCM of l'Érable in the context of her research. Back then, she was a PhD candidate in communication at UQÀM. Her thesis is about information diffusion surrounding the wind farm project and the social division that resulted from the controversial project. In this context, she interviews 93 residents, of which 74 are opposed to the project and 14 are supporters. As a researcher, she is committed to protect the privacy of their personal data. This commitment is part of a consent form signed by her and each participant. She obtains her PhD in 2012.

In November 2012, some residents file a request for a class-action lawsuit against Éoliennes de l'Érable, complaining about inconvenience caused by the construction and operation of the wind farm. The request is accepted in 2014 by the Quebec Superior Court. In 2015, the residents involved in the class action ask Dr Maillé to act as an expert witness in the lawsuit. She accepts.

The lawyers of Éoliennes de l'Érable then make a request to obtain the records of the interviews conducted by Maillé for her PhD, as well as the names of the people interviewed, in order to prepare the company's defense. In January 2016, Judge Marc St-Pierre accepts the request and orders Maillé to transmit the data and private information about her research participants to the company's lawyers. However, as is it generally the case in academic research, the participants privacy was a condition to their participation in the research project. In order to avoid being forced to divulge her data, she withdraws her participation as an expert witness in the lawsuit. Despite her withdrawal, in March 2016, Dr Maillé receives a formal notice from the court ordering her to submit her data within five days. She asks Judge St-Pierre to review his judgement. If maintained, the researcher will either have to break the confidentiality agreement she made with her research participants, or expose herself to a lawsuit for contempt of court.

On May 17, 2017, Marie-Ève Maillé is at Victoriaville courthouse. Assisted by lawyers from UQUÀM, the Fonds de recherche du Québec and the Canadian Association of University Teachers, she wants Judge St-Pierre to review his judgement. The confidentiality engagement between the researcher and the research participants is put forward, as well as the Wigmore criteria. The new ruling is released on May 31, in favour of the researcher. Judge St-Pierre retracts his preceding judgement, which forced Dr Maillé to disclose her brute research data.

Reactions in the scientific community 
Realizing the importance of the stakes in this situation, several scientists publicly give their support to Dr Maillé. In August 2016, Québec's chief scientist Rémi Quirion says Maillé's research would never have been funded without the guarantee that the participants would remain anonymous.
The same day, the director of the Panel on Responsible Conduct of Research, Susan V. Zimmerman emphasizes that it is the researcher's duty to guarantee confidentiality on the information they obtain. On November 3, the Canadian Association of University Teachers says it is concerned by the ordinance forcing Dr Maillé to reveal the identity of the participants to her research. The day after, a letter cosigned by over 200 researchers from institutions in Québec is published. For the authors, the confidentiality of participants' data is an «inescapable aspect of academic research involving humans». They write that «the future of scientific inquiry and citizen confidence in academic research rely on this issue». Some days later, vice-rector for research, discovery, creation and innovation of Université de Montréal reiterates the importance of respecting research participants private life, which is a «key element of ethics of research involving human participants». At Université du Québec à Rimouski, researchers emphasize that failing to protect information obtained in a research context may «deter citizen response to researchers requests and questions as well as restricting access to first hand data essential to a fine understanding of social realities».

On November 28, 2016, UQÀM files a voluntary intervention to the court, collectively with the Fonds québécois de la recherche sur la nature et les technologies, the Fonds de recherche du Québec en santé and the Fonds de recherche du Québec Société et culture. By doing so, they show their support for Dr Maillé in her request to have the ordinance annulled.

The still ongoing story has also been taken up by the Canadian Civil Liberties Association and by Science.

References

See also 
 Deontological ethics

Information sensitivity
Université du Québec à Montréal